Eastern Middle Atlas Berber is a cluster of Berber dialects spoken in the eastern and north-eastern parts of the Middle Atlas, in Morocco. These dialects are those of the tribes of Aït Seghrushen, Aït Waraïn, Marmusha, Aït Alaham, Aït Yub and Aït Morghi.

Despite the fact that they are mutually intelligible with neighbouring Central Atlas Tamazight dialects and are generally classified among them, these dialects actually belong to the Zenati languages and are intermediate dialects between the Riffian and Atlas languages.

Among these Zenati dialects, those of Aït Seghrouchen and Aït Waraïn were subject to most studies, while only a few studies were focused on the dialects of Aït Alaham and Marmusha, and practically none focused on the dialects of Aït Yub and Aït Morghi.

References

Berber languages
Languages of Morocco